Gonospira bourguignati is a species of air-breathing land snail, terrestrial pulmonate gastropod mollusk in the family Streptaxidae.

Description
The length of the shell attains 9 mm.

Distribution
This species  is endemic to Réunion, an island located in the Indian Ocean, east of Madagascar.

References

 Griffiths, O.L. & Florens, V.F.B. (2006). A field guide to the non-marine molluscs of the Mascarene Islands (Mauritius, Rodrigues and Réunion) and the northern dependencies of Mauritius. Bioculture Press: Mauritius. Pp. i–xv, 1–185

External links
  Deshayes G.P. (1863). Catalogue des mollusques de l'île de la Réunion (Bourbon). Pp. 1-144. In Maillard, L. (Ed.) Notes sur l'Ile de la Réunion. Dentu, Paris

Gonospira
Taxonomy articles created by Polbot
Endemic fauna of Réunion
Gastropods described in 1863